The 2022 season was Kawasaki Frontale's 18th consecutive season in the J1 League. They competed in the AFC Champions League, Emperor's Cup, J.League Cup, and the Japanese Super Cup. No major trophies were won by Frontale, however, their season performance at the J1 qualified them to the 2023-24 AFC Champions League, in which they qualified straight into the group stage.

Squad
As of 10 August 2022.

First-team squad

Out on loan

Transfers

Transfers in

Transfers out

Competitions

Overview

J1 League

Table

Results summary

Results by matchday

Matches

AFC Champions League

Group stage

Table

Matches

Emperor's Cup

Results

J.League Cup

Matches

Prime stage

Japanese Super Cup

Friendlies

Statistics

Goalscorers

Clean sheets

Anker Power Player of the Month

References

Kawasaki Frontale
Kawasaki Frontale seasons